Knobstone may refer to:

Knobstone Escarpment, a geologic region in Southern Indiana
Knobstone Trail, a long-distance hiking trail in Indiana